Nací para tí is the last album by Mexican pop singer Rocío Banquells. This album was released in 2007. It was recorded live in the Teatro de la Ciudad in Mexico City on May 10, 2007.

History
The album is the return of Banquells to the world of the music after 10 years. The album was recorded on live in the Teatro de la Ciudad in Mexico City. The album includes two discs: The first includes a compilation of Pop and Balada songs of the Banquells's career. The second is a compilation of her Mariachi songs. The second disc includes a new mariachi version of the 1985's classic Luna mágica.

Track listing

Disc One
Tracks:
 Este hombre no se toca
 Amantes
 Con él
 Escucha el infiníto
 Estupido
 Coincidír
 Recuerdos (Memory)
 No llores por mí Argentina (Don't cry for me Argentina)
 Abrázame
 No soy una muñeca

Disc Two
Tracks:
 Intro Mariachi
 Que bonita es mi tierra
 La Noche y tu
 Libro abierto
 Llorarás
 Cielo Rojo
 Entrega Total
 Nací para tí
 Fué un placer conocerte
 Echame a mí la culpa
 La mujer ladina
 La puerta negra
 Cucurrucucu Paloma
 Luna mágica
 Si nos dejan
 Nací para tí (Studio)
 Luna magica (Mariachi version, Studio)

Singles
 Luna mágica (Mariachi version, Studio)

Reference list

2007 albums